Yeshey Dorji, commonly known as "Bumlay" (born 2 January 1989), is a Bhutanese footballer. He made his first appearance for the Bhutan national football team in 2008. He is also a member of the Bhutan national futsal team. After the 2013 SAFF Championship he retired from international duty, returning in 2015 World Cup qualifiers.

Career statistics

International goals

References

External links
Official website

Bhutanese footballers
Bhutan international footballers
Yeedzin F.C. players
Living people
1985 births
People from Thimphu
Association football forwards